Ben Davies (born 18 January 1991) is a Welsh ice hockey player for Cardiff Devils and the British national team.

He represented Great Britain at the 2019 IIHF World Championship, where he scored the overtime goal against France to avoid Britain's relegation to Division I, and again at the 2021 IIHF World Championship and 2022 IIHF World Championship.

References

External links

1991 births
Basingstoke Bison players
Braehead Clan players
British expatriate ice hockey people
Welsh expatriate sportspeople in Australia
Welsh expatriate sportspeople in the United States
Cardiff Devils players
Coventry Blaze players
Guildford Flames players
Living people
Manchester Storm (2015–) players
Melbourne Mustangs players
Norfolk Admirals (ECHL) players
Sportspeople from Cardiff
Swindon Wildcats players
Welsh ice hockey forwards
Expatriate ice hockey players in Australia
Expatriate ice hockey players in the United States